Simone Perico (born 10 August 1989) is an Italian footballer who plays as a defender for Serie C club Giana Erminio.

Career
Born in Seriate, the Province of Bergamo, Perico started his career with Atalanta Bergamo, then left for Poggibonsi in 2008 In 2009, he left for another Lega Pro Seconda Divisione club Pro Sesto. He played 21 times for the bottom team.

On 11 September 2010, he signed a 1-year contract with Lega Pro Prima Divisione club Barletta on free transfer. He was immediately included in the starting XI, ahead Alessio Lanotte as defender.

References

External links
 
 Football.it Profile 

1989 births
People from Seriate
Living people
Italian footballers
Association football fullbacks
Atalanta B.C. players
U.S. Poggibonsi players
S.S.D. Pro Sesto players
A.S.D. Barletta 1922 players
A.C. Ponte San Pietro Isola S.S.D. players
Serie C players
Serie D players
A.S. Giana Erminio players
Sportspeople from the Province of Bergamo
Footballers from Lombardy